The University of North Carolina is the multi-campus public university system for the state of North Carolina. Overseeing the state's 16 public universities and the NC School of Science and Mathematics, it is commonly referred to as the UNC System to differentiate it from its flagship, UNC-Chapel Hill.

The university system has a total enrollment of 244,507 students as of fall 2021. UNC campuses conferred 62,930 degrees in 2020–2021, the bulk of which were at the bachelor's level, with 44,309 degrees awarded. In 2008, the UNC System conferred over 75% of all baccalaureate degrees in North Carolina.

History

Foundations 
Founded in 1789, the University of North Carolina at Chapel Hill is one of three schools to claim the title of oldest public university in the United States. It closed from 1871 to 1875, faced with serious financial and enrollment problems during the Reconstruction era. In 1877, the state of North Carolina began sponsoring additional higher education institutions. Over time, the state added a women's college (now known as the University of North Carolina at Greensboro), a land-grant university (North Carolina State University), five historically black institutions (North Carolina A&T State University, North Carolina Central University, Winston-Salem State University, Fayetteville State University, and Elizabeth City State University) and one to educate American Indians (the University of North Carolina at Pembroke). Others were created to prepare teachers for public education and to instruct performing artists.

Early consolidation 
During the Great Depression, the North Carolina General Assembly searched for cost savings within state government. Towards this effort in 1931, it redefined the University of North Carolina, which at the time referred exclusively to the University of North Carolina at Chapel Hill; the new Consolidated University of North Carolina was created to include the existing campuses of University of North Carolina at Chapel Hill, North Carolina State College (now North Carolina State University), and the Woman's College (now the University of North Carolina at Greensboro). The three campuses came under the leadership of a single board of trustees and a single president, with "Deans of Administration" serving as day-to-day leaders of the three campuses. In 1945, the title "Dean of Administration" was changed to "Chancellor." By 1969, three additional campuses had joined the Consolidated University through legislative action: the University of North Carolina at Charlotte, the University of North Carolina at Asheville, and the University of North Carolina at Wilmington.

Consolidation continued 
In 1971, North Carolina passed legislation bringing into the University of North Carolina all 16 public institutions that confer bachelor's degrees. This latest round of consolidation gave each constituent school its own chancellor and board of trustees. In 1985, the North Carolina School of Science and Mathematics, the nation's first public residential high school for gifted students, was declared an affiliated school of the university. In 2007, the high school became a full member of the university.

Protocols during the COVID-19 pandemic
In March 2020, due to the COVID-19 pandemic, the UNC System shut down in-person instruction at all of its campuses indefinitely. In an unprecedented move to limit the spread of the disease, institutions were asked to remove as many students from on-campus housing as possible, implement remote work wherever practical, and to transition to distance education.

Presidents 

An asterisk (*) denotes acting president.
Two asterisks (**) denotes chairman of the faculty.

Legal mandate 

The legal authority and mandate for the University of North Carolina is contained in the State's first Constitution (1776), which provided in Article XLI
That a school or schools shall be established by the Legislature, for the convenient instruction of youth, ... and all useful learning shall be duly encouraged, and promoted, in one or more universities,
The state legislature granted a charter and funding for the university in 1789.

Article IX of the 1971 North Carolina Constitution deals with all forms of public education in the state. Sections 8 and 9 of that article address higher education.
 Sec. 8. Higher education.
The General Assembly shall maintain a public system of higher education, comprising The University of North Carolina and such other institutions of higher education as the General Assembly may deem wise. The General Assembly shall provide for the selection of trustees of The University of North Carolina and of the other institutions of higher education, in whom shall be vested all the privileges, rights, franchises, and endowments heretofore granted to or conferred upon the trustees of these institutions. The General Assembly may enact laws necessary and expedient for the maintenance and management of The University of North Carolina and the other public institutions of higher education.

 Sec. 9. Benefits of public institutions of higher education.
The General Assembly shall provide that the benefits of The University of North Carolina and other public institutions of higher education, as far as practicable, be extended to the people of the State free of expense.

Statutory provisions stipulate the current function and cost to students of the University of North Carolina.

Institutions 
Within its seventeen campuses, UNC houses two medical schools and one teaching hospital, ten nursing programs, two schools of dentistry, one veterinary school and hospital, and a school of pharmacy, as well as a two law schools, 15 schools of education, three schools of engineering, and a school for performing artists. The oldest university, the University of North Carolina at Chapel Hill, first admitted students in 1795. The smallest and newest member is the North Carolina School of Science and Mathematics, a residential two-year high school, founded in 1980 and a full member of the university since 2007. The largest university is North Carolina State University, with 34,340 students as of fall 2012.

While the official names of each campus are determined by the North Carolina General Assembly, abbreviations are determined by the individual school.

Notes
The enrollment numbers are the official headcounts (including all full-time and part-time, undergrad and postgrad students) from University of North Carolina website.  This does not include the North Carolina School of Science and Mathematics, the figure for NCSSM is taken from its own website.

The following universities became four-year institutions after their founding (date each became a four-year institution in parentheses):
East Carolina University (1920)
North Carolina Central University (1925)
Winston-Salem State University (1925) 
Western Carolina University (1929)
Appalachian State University (1929)
Elizabeth City State University (1937)
University of North Carolina at Pembroke (1939)
Fayetteville State University (1939)
University of North Carolina at Asheville (1963)
University of North Carolina at Charlotte (1963)
University of North Carolina at Wilmington (1963)

With the exception of the University of North Carolina at Pembroke and the University of North Carolina School of the Arts, the institutions that joined the University of North Carolina in 1972 did so under their current name.  As of 1972, all public four-year institutions in North Carolina are members of the university.

Affiliates

See also 

List of colleges and universities in North Carolina
North Carolina Community College System

References

Further reading
 McGrath, Eileen, and Linda Jacobson. "The Great Depression and Its Impact on an Emerging Research Library: The University of North Carolina Library, 1929–1941," Libraries and the Cultural Record, (2011), 46#3 pp 295–320.

External links 

 
 Universities and colleges in North Carolina
N
Educational institutions established in 1789
1789 establishments in North Carolina